Rio da Conceição is a municipality in the state of Tocantins in the Northern region of Brazil.

The municipality contains part of the  Serra Geral do Tocantins Ecological Station, a strictly protected conservation unit created in 2001 to preserve an area of cerrado.

See also
List of municipalities in Tocantins

References

Municipalities in Tocantins